Yucca rostrata  also called beaked yucca, is a tree-like plant belonging to the genus Yucca. The species is native to Texas, and the Chihuahua and Coahuila regions of Mexico. This species of Yucca occurs in areas that are arid with little annual rainfall. 

Yucca rostrata has a trunk up to 4.5 meters tall, with a crown of leaves at the top. Leaves are thin, stiff, up to 60 cm long but rarely more than 15 mm wide, tapering to a sharp point at the tip. The inflorescence is a large panicle 100 cm tall, with white flowers.

Cultivation
As one of the hardiest trunk-forming yuccas, Yucca rostrata can be grown successfully outdoors down to USDA hardiness zone 5 and is popular in the Southwestern United States. The tree-like plant is commonly cultivated in El Paso, Texas, Albuquerque, New Mexico, Salt Lake City, Utah, and Denver, Colorado.

Cultivars 

 'Sapphire Skies' has powder blue foliage.

References

 Fritz Hochstätter (Hrsg.):  Yucca (Agavaceae). Band 1 Dehiscent-fruited species in the Southwest and Midwest of the USA, Canada and Baja California , Selbst Verlag, 2000. 
 Fritz Hochstätter (Hrsg.):  Yucca (Agavaceae). Band 2 Indehiscent-fruited species in the Southwest, Midwest and East of the USA, Selbst Verlag. 2002. 
 Fritz Hochstätter (Hrsg.):  Yucca (Agavaceae). Band 3 Mexico , Selbst Verlag, 2004. 
 Die Gattung Yucca Fritz Hochstätter
 Yucca I   Verbreitungskarte I Fritz Hochstätter

External links
 Yucca rostrata care
 Common names of yucca species
Interactive Distribution Map of Yucca rostrata
photo of herbarium specimen at Missouri Botanical Garden, type of Yucca rostrata

rostrata
Flora of Coahuila
Flora of Chihuahua (state)
Flora of Texas
Plants described in 1902
Taxa named by George Engelmann